The Chennai Centre for China Studies (C3S) is an Indian think tank that carries out research on developments in China offering a peninsular perspective and assigns priority to Indian policy interests.

History 
C3S was registered under the Tamil Nadu Societies Registration Act (1975) in 2008 and is a non-profit organization.

Areas of research 
 Business and Economics
 Defence and Security
 Geopolitics and Strategy
 Society and Politics
 Science and Technology
 Human Rights and Law
 Culture and History
 Environment and Health

Young Minds of C3S 
The Young Minds of C3S is an initiative taken by C3S that is designed to encourage a younger generation of China-oriented scholars to contribute to the academic and technical conversation around the subject of China and Indo-China relations.

References

 Think tanks based in Asia